Cynips douglasii, the spined turbaned gall wasp, is a species of gall wasp in the family Cynipidae. It induces galls in valley oaks, blue oak, and scrub oaks. These galls are noted for their spines and can be white, purple, or pink. They can be up to 15 mm high and 10 mm wide. For the unisexual generation, female adult wasps emerge from the galls in January and February. The smaller bisexual generation emerges in spring and produces rounder galls.

References

External links

 

Cynipidae
Gall-inducing insects
Oak galls